Stephen Morris (born 13 May 1976) is an English former professional footballer, who made appearances in the English Football League with Wrexham.

Career
Morris was signed by Wrexham for free from Liverpool's academy. He made 42 appearances in the football league for Wrexham between 1994 and 1997. During this time he was loaned to Rochdale.

He left Wrexham in 1997, signing for Southport - but only played one game for the Conference side. In December 1999, Morris signed for Chelmsford City. At the end of the season, Morris left Chelmsford.

References

1976 births
Wrexham A.F.C. players
Rochdale A.F.C. players
Southport F.C. players
Chelmsford City F.C. players
Living people
Association football forwards
English footballers